Railroad Wash is a tributary ephemeral stream or wash (or arroyo) of Gold Gulch in Cochise County, Arizona. Its mouth is below its confluence with Gold Gulch, at an elevation of  near Creighton Reservoir.

References

Railroad Wash (Gold Gulch)
Rivers of Arizona